The 1942 Fort Monmouth Signalmen football team represented Fort Monmouth during the 1942 college football season. The Signalmen compiled a 5–2–2 record, outscored their opponents by a total of 132 to 62, and shut out four opponents, on their way to capturing the mythical Second Army Corps area service crown with wins over Fort Totten and Camp Upton, along with a tie against Manhattan Beach.  They would be ranked No. 14 in the Associated Press post-season poll for service academies.

Schedule

References

 
Fort Monmouth
Fort Monmouth Signalmen football seasons
Fort Monmouth Signalmen football